Hugh Keays-Byrne (18 May 1947 – 2 December 2020) was a British-Australian actor and film director. A former member of the Royal Shakespeare Company, he was best known for playing the main antagonist in two films from the Mad Max franchise: Toecutter in Mad Max (1979), and Immortan Joe in Mad Max: Fury Road (2015). He also played Toad in the 1974 biker film Stone, and Grunchlk on the science fiction series Farscape.

Early life 
Keays-Byrne was born in Srinagar, in the state of Jammu and Kashmir (part of the British Raj then, India now) to British parents; his family returned to Britain when India was partitioned.  He began his career as a stage actor. Between 1968 and 1972, he had parts in Royal Shakespeare Company productions including As You Like It, The Balcony, King Lear, Hamlet, Much Ado About Nothing, A Midsummer Night's Dream, The Tempest or The Enchanted Island, Doctor Faustus, The Man of Mode, Troilus and Cressida, Enemies, The Revenger's Tragedy, and Bartholomew Fair.

Career
Keays-Byrne made his first television appearance in 1967 on the British television programme Boy Meets Girl.  He was part of Peter Brook's production of A Midsummer Night's Dream with the Royal Shakespeare Company, which toured Australia in 1973.  Keays-Byrne decided to remain in Australia after the tour ended. In 1974, he acted in the TV movie Essington, then made his first film appearance in the motorcycle picture Stone (1974).  This was followed by supporting roles in films like The Man from Hong Kong (1975), Mad Dog Morgan (1976), The Trespassers  (1976) and Snapshot (1979).

After his first starring role in the 1978 TV movie Death Train, Keays-Byrne was cast as the violent gang leader Toecutter in Mad Max (1979).  Director George Miller had Keays-Byrne and the other actors for the gang travel from Sydney to Melbourne in a group on motorcycles, as there was no money for airplane tickets.  In an early international print of the film, Keays-Byrne was dubbed with a bad American accent, which Miller later regretted.

Keays-Byrne then continued to act in post-apocalyptic and science fiction films like The Chain Reaction (1980), Strikebound (1984), Starship (1985) and The Blood of Heroes (1989). In 1992, he made his directorial debut and acted in the film Resistance.  He also appeared in TV miniseries adaptations of Moby Dick (1998) and Journey to the Centre of the Earth (1999).

Keays-Byrne played Grunchlk in the science fiction television series Farscape (1999–2003) and its conclusion Farscape: The Peacekeeper Wars (2004). George Miller also cast him as the Martian Manhunter in the planned 2009 movie Justice League: Mortal.

Keays-Byrne returned to the Mad Max franchise in the 2015 film Mad Max: Fury Road as the main villain Immortan Joe.  The film was nominated for 10 Academy Awards, including Best Picture, winning 6, and Keays-Byrne was nominated for the MTV Movie Award for Best Villain.

Personal life 
Keays-Byrne and his partner Christina were long-time residents of Lisarow.  They were also part of the Macau Light Company, an artist collective based in Centennial Park.  His hobbies included painting, poetry, and gardening.

Death
Keays-Byrne died peacefully on 2 December 2020 at Gosford Hospital in NSW, at the age of 73. His death was confirmed on social media by his friend, The Man from Hong Kong director Brian Trenchard-Smith.

Filmography

Films
Stone (1974) - Toad 
The Man from Hong Kong (1975) - Morrie Grosse
Mad Dog Morgan (1976) - Simon
The Trespassers (1976) – Frank
Blue Fin (1978) – Stan
Mad Max (1979) – Toecutter
Snapshot (1979) – Linsey
The Chain Reaction (1980) – Eagle
Ginger Meggs (1982) – Captain Hook
Going Down (1983) – Bottom, the biker
Where the Green Ants Dream (1984) – Mining executive
Strikebound (1984) – Idris Williams
Lorca and the Outlaws (1984) – Danny
Burke & Wills (1985) – Ambrose Kyte
For Love Alone (1986) – Andrew Hawkins
Kangaroo (1987) – Kangaroo
Les Patterson Saves the World (1987) – Inspector Farouk
The Blood of Heroes (1989) – Lord Vlle
Resistance (1992) – Peter
Huntsman 5.1 (1999) – Bain
Sleeping Beauty (2011) – Man 3
Mad Max: Fury Road (2015) – Immortan Joe (Final film role)

Television
Boy Meets Girl (1967) – Leslie
Rush (1974–1976)
Essington (1974, TV Movie)
The Tichborne Affair (1975, TV Movie) – Tichborne
The Outsiders (1976) – Doyle
Say You Want Me (1977, TV Movie) – Harry Kirby
Death Train (1978, TV Movie) – Ted Morrow
Barnaby and Me (1978, TV Movie) – Huggins
Secret Valley (1980, TV Movie) – William Whopper
Runaway Island (1982, TV Movie) – Lucas the Ratter
Treasure Island (1987, TV Movie) (voice)
Badlands 2005 (1988, TV Movie) – Moondance
Dadah Is Death (1988, TV Movie) – Hammed
Joe Wilson (1988, TV Mini-Series) – Bob Galletley
Singapore Sling: Old Flames (1995, TV Movie)
Moby Dick (1998, TV Mini-Series) – Mr. Stubb
Journey to the Center of the Earth (1999, TV Mini-Series) – McNiff
Farscape (2001) – Grunchlk
Farscape: The Peacekeeper Wars (2004) – Grunchlk

Awards and nominations

References

External links

 Hugh Keays-Byrne at Theatricalia.

1947 births
2020 deaths
20th-century English male actors
21st-century English male actors
English male stage actors
English film directors
English male television actors
English male film actors
Logie Award winners
People from Srinagar
English emigrants to Australia
20th-century Australian male actors
21st-century Australian male actors
Australian male television actors
Australian male film actors
Australian film directors